Acacia cerastes is a shrub belonging to the genus Acacia. It is native to a small area in the northern Wheatbelt region of Western Australia.

Description
It has terete and tortuous branchlets that are striated and green or brown in colour. Like most species of Acacia it has phyllodes rather than true leaves. The evergreen phyllodes are often recurved with obscure nerves. It blooms between August and November producing yellow flowers. The rudimentary inflorescences have spherical flower-heads containing 30 golden flowers. The linear shaped seed pods have dehisced valves and are generally rounded over and constricted between the seeds.

Taxonomy
The species was first formally described by the botanist Bruce Maslin in 1995 as part of the work Acacia Miscellany Taxonomy of some Western Australian phyllocladinous and aphyllodinous taxa (Leguminosae: Mimosoideae).  as published in the journal Nuytsia. The species as reclassified as Racosperma cerastes in 2003 by Leslie Pedley but returned to the genus Acacia in 2006.

Distribution
It is found in a small area between Perenjori, Westonia and Yalgoo where it grows in skeletal rocky soils over ironstone on hillslopes. It is mostly found in the Mount Gibson Sanctuary and on Ninghan Station. The type specimen was collected by the botanist Charles Austin Gardner in 1952 from the Mount Gibson area.

See also
List of Acacia species

References

cerastes
Acacias of Western Australia
Plants described in 1995
Taxa named by Bruce Maslin